Bryan Todd Newland is an American attorney and tribal leader serving as the Assistant Secretary of the Interior for Indian Affairs.

Early life and education 
Newland was born and raised in the Bay Mills Indian Community, located in Chippewa County, Michigan. He earned a Bachelor of Arts degree in social relations from Michigan State University and a Juris Doctor in Indian law from the Michigan State University College of Law.

Career 
From 2009 to 2012, Newland served as a senior advisor to the assistant secretary of the Interior for Indian affairs. He then joined the Fletcher Law Firm in Lansing, Michigan. He served as chief judge of the Bay Mills Indian Community from 2013 to 2017 and as tribal chair from 2017 to 2021. He was also a regent of the Bay Mills Community College from 2016 to 2021. In 2020, Newland wrote an op-ed endorsing Pete Buttigieg's 2020 presidential campaign, arguing Buttigieg "speaks to issues important to Tribal Nations and our citizens."

Interior Department Nomination
Newland was formally nominated by President Joe Biden to lead the Bureau of Indian Affairs on April 22, 2021. His nomination was endorsed by the National Congress of American Indians (NCAI) and members of the United States Senate Committee on Indian Affairs. Hearings on his nomination were held before the United States Senate Committee on Indian Affairs on June 9, 2021. The committee favorably reported his nomination to the Senate floor on July 14, 2021. The Senate confirmed Newland's nomination on August 7, 2021, via voice vote.

Newland was sworn into the position in September 2021.

References 

Living people
Year of birth missing (living people)
People from Chippewa County, Michigan
Michigan State University alumni
Michigan State University College of Law alumni
Michigan lawyers
United States Bureau of Indian Affairs personnel
Obama administration personnel
Biden administration personnel
Native American people from Michigan
Native American lawyers